Geneva is an unincorporated community in on the eastern edge of Bear Lake County, Idaho, United States, near the Wyoming border.

Description

Although Geneva is unincorporated, it has a post office, with the ZIP code of 83238; the ZCTA for ZIP Code 83238 had a population of 141 at the 2000 census.

U.S. Route 89 runs west  to Montpelier and northeast  to Smoot, Wyoming.

History
A post office called Geneva has been in operation since 1898.  The community was named after Geneva, in Switzerland, the native land of a large share of the first settlers. The Geneva Cemetery is located in the community.

Geneva's population was 165 in 1909, and was 10 in 1960.

See also

 Charles C. Rich (1809 – 1883), an early leader in the Latter Day Saint movement and pioneer in Geneva and the Bear Lake area.

References

External links

Unincorporated communities in Bear Lake County, Idaho
Unincorporated communities in Idaho